is a short anime film directed by Kazuo Oga and released by Studio Ghibli. A DVD version was released for Japan on July 7, 2006. It is based on a short story of the same name by Kenji Miyazawa.This was a personal film for director Oga, as he cited how he was inspired after reading a collection of Miyazawa's works after working on Princess Mononoke (1997). A special screening was held from February 2 to 7, 2010 during A Ghibli Artisan - Kazuo Oga Exhibition - The One Who Painted Totoro's Forest at the Tokyo Museum of Contemporary Art.

Plot 
This story is about the time when the Tohoku region suffered from famine and lived poorly. In a corner of the Taneyamagahara plateau in the Kitakami Mountains of Iwate Prefecture, Ito, who spends the night with three farmers preparing for mowing from the early morning, dreams. In a dream, Youth Ito interacts with the staff of the Forestry Office about the place where he can be paid to burn charcoal. Suddenly, oak, kashiwa, and birch tree spirits appear. Kodama and the youth Ito interact with each other over whether to cut down the trees in the mountains. For Ito youth, the mountain where the trees were squeezed and "komon" was a rich and "good" landscape where water boiled and akebi and mushrooms could be removed. However, if you don't cut the tree and burn the charcoal, you won't be able to make a living. Kodama, who had been disagreeing with cutting trees, finally answered, "Then there is no point in cutting trees, but burn good charcoal." A mysterious overnight dream story that Kenji Miyazawa tells us that humans are not the only ones living in this world.The movie describes the daily life of mountains farmers and their struggles to keep moving while deepening their understanding of nature and the world they live in, as they encounter mysterious figures and appearances that may change their perspective on everything they have yet experienced.

Authors

Kenji Miyazawa 
Kenji Miyazawa was born in 1896 in Hanamaki City, Iwate Prefecture. After graduating from Morioka Higher Agricultural and Forestry School (currently Iwate University Faculty of Agriculture), he completed graduate school in the same school. After working as a teacher at Hanamaki Agricultural School, he established the Rasuchijin Association and worked hard to teach agriculture while aiming for a literary career. He started writing Tanka when he was a teenager, and since then has expanded his territory to poetry and fairy tales.

Kazuo Oga 
Oga was born in 1952, Akita prefecture. In 1972, he joined Kobayashi Productions, an animation background art company, and worked as a background artist for numerous animated works. While working at Studio Ghibli, he was made the art director of My Neighbor Totoro, Pom Poko and Princess Mononoke. He was also in charge of the backgrounds of Howl's Moving Castle and Tales from Earthsea.

Release 
The film was released on DVD on July 7, 2006. The home release came with a small booklet containing an interview with Kazuo Oga.

A special screening was held for the film during the long running, A Ghibli Artisan - Kazuo Oga Exhibition - The One Who Painted Totoro's Forest at the Tokyo Museum of Contemporary Art. The following copy was written, "This work is not only the beauty of the images depicting the original scenery of Japan, but also the music played as an insert song.

Kenji Miyazawa's lyrics and composition Imperial and Largo-Symphony No. 9 "From the New World" (composed by A. Dvorak) liven up the story, and the clean singing voice of the ensemble planeta is also wonderful." Screenings were held from February 2 to 7, 2010.

References

 Buena Vista Japan

External links 
 
 
 Tioanime

2006 anime films
2000s animated short films
Anime short films
Films based on works by Kenji Miyazawa
Studio Ghibli animated films